Pumla Dineo Gqola (born 3 December 1972) is a South African academic, writer, and gender activist, best known for her 2015 book Rape: A South African Nightmare, which won the 2016 Alan Paton Award. She is a professor of literature at Nelson Mandela University, where she holds the Research Chair in African Feminist Imaginations.

Education and career 
Gqola grew up in Alice in the Eastern Cape of South Africa. She has a BA(Hons) and MA from the University of Cape Town, an MA from the University of Warwick, and a DPhil in postcolonial studies from the Ludwig Maximilian University of Munich. She worked at the University of the Free State from 1997 to 2005, and at the University of the Witwatersrand – where she was associate professor, and later full professor, in literary, media and gender studies at the School of Literature and Language Studies – from 2007 to 2017. In 2018, she was appointed Dean of Research at the University of Fort Hare. She has also been Chief Research Specialist at the Human Sciences Research Council. In May 2020, she joined the Centre for Women and Gender Studies at Nelson Mandela University, where she is a professor in literature, specialising in African and postcolonial literature, African feminism, and slave memory. In late 2020, she was awarded a National Research Foundation Research Chair in African Feminist Imaginations, dedicated to interdisciplinary gender scholarship. Her articles for public audiences have appeared in publications including the New Frame and the New York Times.

Works 
Gqola's first book, What is Slavery to Me?: Postcolonial/Slave Memory in Post-Apartheid South Africa (2010) is an academic, interdisciplinary study of slave memory in South Africa and its significance for contemporary gender and race dynamics. It was longlisted for the 2011 Alan Paton Award. A Renegade Called Simphiwe (2013) is about South African singer Simphiwe Dana, and combines biography with cultural analysis. Gqola is best known for her two books about rape culture – Rape: A South African Nightmare (2015) and Female Fear Factory: Gender and Patriarchy under Racial Capitalism (2021). She has also published a collection of essays, Reflecting Rogue: Inside the Mind of a Feminist (2018), which was favourably received and longlisted for the 2018 Alan Paton Award.

Rape: A South African Nightmare 
In Rape (2015), written for public audiences, Gqola examines the history, workings, and social functions of sexual violence in South Africa. She argues that rape is an act of power and violence, rather than a sex act, and in South Africa is normalised and legitimised by various social norms, images, and attitudes. Gqola introduces the notion of the "female fear factory," also the subject of her most recent book, Female Fear Factory (2021), to refer to the social discourses with she claims regulate women's behaviour through "the manufacture of female fear," especially by the subtle but ubiquitous assertion of male ownership over their bodies. She argues that these discourses are strengthened by the public prominence of hyper-masculine figures such as Jacob Zuma, Julius Malema, Kenny Kunene, and Oscar Pistorius, and she dedicates a chapter to analysing the public and media response to the Jacob Zuma rape trial of 2005-6.

Rape received positive reviews, with the Daily Maverick calling it "brilliant and distressing." It won the 2016 Alan Paton Award. Chair of Judges Achmat Dangor said it was "fearless" and "nuanced and cogently argued."

Bibliography

Books
 What is Slavery to Me?: Postcolonial/Slave Memory in Post-Apartheid South Africa. Johannesburg: Wits University Press, 2010. ISBN 9781868146925.
 A Renegade Called Simphiwe. Johannesburg: MFBooks, 2013. ISBN 9781920601089. 
 Rape: A South African Nightmare. Johannesburg: MF Books, 2015. 
 Reflecting Rogue: Inside the Mind of a Feminist. Johannesburg: Jacana Media, 2018. ISBN 9781920601874.
 Female Fear Factory: Gender and Patriarchy under Racial Capitalism. La Vergne: Melinda Ferguson Books, 2021. ISBN 9781990973109.

As editor
 Miriam Tlali, Writing Freedom. Cape Town: HSRC Press, 2021. ISBN 0796925623.

Selected articles
 "Homeland banter." In Running Towards Us: New Writing from South Africa (ed. Isabel Balseiro). Portsmouth: Heinemann, 2000. ISBN 0325002312.
 "Ufanele uqavile: blackwomen, feminisms and postcoloniality in Africa." Agenda: Empowering Women for Gender Equity (50): 11–22, 2001. ISSN 1013-0950.
 "Language and power, languages of power: a black woman's journey through three South African universities." In Hear Our Voices: Race, Gender and the Status of Black South African Women in the Academy (ed. Reitumetse Obakeng Mabokela and Zine Magubane). Pretoria: UNISA, 2004. ISBN 1868882942. 
 "How the 'cult of femininity' and violent masculinities support endemic gender based violence in contemporary South Africa." African Identities. 5(1): 111–124, 2007. doi:10.1080/14725840701253894. ISSN 1472-5843.
 "Brutal inheritances: echoes, negrophobia and masculinist violence." In Go Home or Die Here: Violence, Xenophobia and the Reinvention of Difference in South Africa (ed. Shireen Hassim). Johannesburg: Wits University Press, 2008. ISBN 9781868144877. 
 "The status of women in Africa: a reflection on patterns and eruptions." In Gender Instruments in Africa: Consolidating Gains in the Southern African Development Community (ed. Michele Ruiters). Midrand: Institute for Global Dialogue, 2008. ISBN 1920216081.
 "'The difficult task of normalizing freedom': spectacular masculinities, Ndebele's literary/cultural commentary and post-Apartheid life." English in Africa. 36(1): 61–76, 2009. ISSN 0376-8902.
 "Unconquered and insubordinate: embracing black feminist intellectual activist legacies." In Becoming Worthy Ancestors: Archive, Public Deliberation and Identity in South Africa (ed. Xolela Mangcu). Johannesburg: Wits University Press, 2011. ISBN 9781868145577.
 "a playful but also very serious love letter to gabrielle goliath." In Surfacing: On Being Black and Feminist in South Africa (ed. Desiree Lewis and Gabeba Baderoon). Johannesburg: Wits University Press, 2021. ISBN 1776146107.

Awards 
 2016, Alan Paton Award

References

External links 
 Excerpt from Rape
 Excerpt from Female Fear Factory
 2018 TB Davie Memorial Lecture: "Between academic inheritance and the urgency of definitions”
 2020 Tambo Foundation Lecture: "Patriarchal violence and the inadequacy of condemnations"
 2021 conversation with Chimamanda Ngozi Adichie

1971 births
South African feminists
South African women writers
People from the Eastern Cape
University of Cape Town alumni
Alumni of the University of Warwick
Ludwig Maximilian University of Munich alumni
Academic staff of Nelson Mandela University
Academic staff of the University of Fort Hare
Academic staff of the University of the Free State
Academic staff of the University of the Witwatersrand
Postcolonial literature
Living people